Eupithecia lucigera is a moth in the family Geometridae. It is found from the western Himalayas to southern China.

References

Moths described in 1889
lucigera
Moths of Asia